Náměšť nad Oslavou is a town in Třebíč District in the Vysočina Region of the Czech Republic. It has about 4,700 inhabitants. The historic town centre is well preserved and is protected by law as an urban monument zone.

Administrative parts
Villages of Jedov, Otradice and Zňátky are administrative parts of Náměšť nad Oslavou.

Geography
The southern part of the municipal territory with most of the built-up area lies in the Jevišovice Uplands. The town lies on the Oslava River.

History

Náměšť was founded around 1220. The first written mention of Náměšť is from 1234, when the castle was owned by the lords of Lomnice. In the 14th and 15th centuries, Náměšť was frequently conquered and destroyed by various armies. In 1304, Náměšť was destroyed by Cumans, in 1408 by the army of Lacko of Kravaře, and during the Hussite Wars by the armies of Sigismund and Albert II.

From 1481 to 1563, Náměšť was owned by the lords of Lomnice again. In 1563, it was acquired by Jan the Elder of Zierotin, who had replaced the old Gothic castle with a new large Renaissance residence. Jan's successor Karl the Elder of Zierotin sold the manor to Albrecht of Wallenstein in 1628, who immediately sold it to the House of Werdenberg. The Werdenberg family owned it until 1733.

From 1752 until the abolition of manorialism, Náměšť was in the possession of the Haugwitz family. The railway was built in 1866. In 1923, Náměšť nad Oslavou was promoted to a town.

Demographics

Culture
Since 1986, the town has been hosting the folk music festival Folkové prázdniny ("Folk Holidays").

Sights

The town is known for its Baroque bridge. It was built in 1737 and is decorated by twenty sculptures. It has the richest sculptural decoration in Moravia and the second richest in the country after the Charles Bridge in Prague.

Náměšť nad Oslavou Castle is the main landmark of the town and a national cultural monument. It is located on a hilltop above the town. It was built in 1572–1579. Today it is open to the public. It includes a castle park with valuable trees.

The Church of Saint John the Baptist on the town square was built in 1639. It replaced an old Romanesque structure. The neighbouring complex of the rectory with Chapel of Saint Anne was built in the Baroque style in 1740–1745.

Notable people
František Antonín Míča (1696–1744), conductor and composer
Karel František Koch (1890–1981), physician, known for rescuing Jews during the Holocaust
Michael Rabušic (born 1989), footballer

Twin towns – sister cities

Náměšť nad Oslavou is twinned with:
 Medzilaborce, Slovakia

References

External links

Official website of the castle

Cities and towns in the Czech Republic
Populated places in Třebíč District